Dolly Anwar (1 July 1948 – 3 July 1991) was a Bangladeshi stage, television and film actress and writer and editor of Saatdin magazine. She was awarded Bangladesh National Film Award for Best Actress for her role in the film Surjo Dighol Bari (1979).

Early life 
Anwar was the daughter of Nilima Ibrahim, a political and feminist activist, and Muhammad Ibrahim, a physician. She was an undergraduate student in literature at Jagannath College.

Career 
Anwar began her career on stage at the age of 13. At 16, she acted in Aktala Dotala by Munier Choudhury and Roj Roj the first play and the first drama serial respectively on Bangladesh Television.  She later acted in Zahir Raihan's Borof Gola Nodi and Arek Phalgun plays. Her film debut was the multiple national film award-winning Surja Dighal Bari in 1979. Her second and last acted film was Dahan (1986), directed by Sheikh Niamat Ali.

Anwar left acting and started serving as the director of an advertisement agency and the editor of a weekly, Saatdin.

Personal life and death
Anwar first married Raju in 1966, a student leader. She then married Anwar Hossain, a photographer, and cinematographer.

Anwar committed suicide on 3 July 1991 and died at the Dhaka Medical College and Hospital later that night.

References

External links
 

 

1948 births
Bangladeshi film actresses
Bangladeshi television actresses
20th-century Bangladeshi actresses
Best Actress National Film Awards (Bangladesh) winners
Burials at Mirpur Martyred Intellectual Graveyard
Place of birth missing
Best Actress Bachsas Award winners
1991 suicides
Suicides in Bangladesh